R.R. Educational Trusts College of Education, in Mulund, Maharashtra, India, is a college. It is also known as RR Educational Trust College of Education and Research. It was formed under the able leadership of Late Shri.R.R.Singhji (Ex-Mayor- Mumbai) in the year 1995 and was aptly supported by Shri.Ramchandra Singh, Dr.Shri.Rajendraprasad Singh, Shri. Mahendra Singh and other members of the trust.

Additional Information:
 Shantiniketan School (CBSE) - (ICSE - Proposed)
 Marathi & English Medium Pre-Primary School
 Marathi & English Medium Primary School
 Marathi & English Medium Secondary School
 Science & Commerce Junior College
 D. T. Ed Teacher's Training College (Marathi Medium)
 B. Ed College (Mumbai University)
 Proposed Degree College for Commerce & Science

Colleges of education in India
Research institutes in Mumbai
Universities and colleges in Mumbai
Educational institutions in India with year of establishment missing